The 1996 Chicago Bears season was their 77th regular season completed in the National Football League (NFL). They failed to improve on their 9–7 record from 1995 and finished with a 7–9 record under head coach Dave Wannstedt. It was the team's first losing season since 1993 when it was Wannstedt's first season.

Offseason

NFL draft

Staff

Roster

Regular season

Schedule

Standings

References

External links 

 1996 Chicago Bears at Pro-Football-Reference.com

Chicago Bears
Chicago Bears seasons
Bear
1990s in Chicago
1996 in Illinois